Siege of Genoa may refer to:
 Siege of Genoa (1318)
 Siege of Genoa (1508)
 Siege of Genoa (1522)
 Siege of Genoa (1746)
 Siege of Genoa (1747)
 Siege of Genoa (1800)
 Siege of Genoa (1814)

See also
 Sack of Genoa (935)
 Bombardment of Genoa (1684)
 Raid on Genoa (1793)
 Battle of Genoa (1795)
 Revolt of Genoa (1849)